Henry Frank Turner (born August 18, 1966) is a retired American professional basketball player, who played at the shooting guard and small forward positions. He grew up in Martinez, California.

College career
Turner played college basketball at California State University, Fullerton, with the Cal State Fullerton Titans. He graduated in 1988.

Professional career
Turner had a two-season stint in the NBA, with the Sacramento Kings (1989–90 and 1994–95), with little impact – he averaged 3 points and one rebound per game, in 66 regular season games combined.

In Europe, Turner played mainly in Italy in the top-tier Lega Basket Serie A, representing Emmezeta Udine (Italian 2nd Division), Panna Firenze (Italian 2nd Division), Ducato Siena (Jun–Oct 1998), BingoSNAI Montecatini, Müller Verona, and Adecco Milano). He also had spells in Turkey, with the Turkish League club Fenerbahçe, and in Greece, with the Greek Basket League clubs Panionios and Maroussi.

While playing in Greece for Panionios during the 1993–94 season, Turner thrilled the crowds with his performances and stunning slam dunks. Both came together in one memorable first-half performance against PAOK in the semi-final of the Korać Cup. In front of a full-house of raucous Panionios fans, Turner scored 30 points in the first-half, and capped it with a 360 degree dunk that had the supporters (and game commentator) in delirium. Unfortunately for Turner and Panionios, they faded in the second-half, and lost a 20-point lead and the game, by a score of 83-85, with Turner ending up with 37 points. Nevertheless, the first half remains etched in the memory of Panionios fans, and more generally, followers of Greek basketball from that unforgettable era.

While playing with Fenerbahçe, Turner was granted Turkish citizenship, and played under the name Hakkı Uzun.

Post playing career
Turner retired from playing basketball in 2002, at age 36, and went on to work as a basketball analyst for Comcast, with co-hosts Jim Kozimor, Kayte Christensen, and Lafayette Lever, covering Sacramento Kings games.

References

External links
TBLStat.net Profile
NBA stats @ Basketball-Reference

1966 births
Living people
American emigrants to Turkey
American expatriate basketball people in Greece
American expatriate basketball people in Italy
American expatriate basketball people in Spain
American expatriate basketball people in Turkey
American men's basketball players
Basketball players from Oakland, California
Cal State Fullerton Titans men's basketball players
Fenerbahçe men's basketball players
Greek Basket League players
Maroussi B.C. players
Mens Sana Basket players
Montecatiniterme Basketball players
Naturalized citizens of Turkey
Olimpia Milano players
Pallalcesto Amatori Udine players
Panionios B.C. players
Rochester Flyers players
Scaligera Basket Verona players
Shooting guards
Small forwards
Turkish men's basketball players
Turkish people of African-American descent
Undrafted National Basketball Association players